Gunashli (Azerbaijani: Günəşli) is an offshore oil field in the Caspian Sea, located  east of Baku, Azerbaijan,  southeast of Oil Rocks and its deep water section is a part of the larger Azeri–Chirag–Guneshli (ACG) project. The Azerbaijani translation of Gunashli means "sunny". Gunashli is believed to have more than 100 million tonnes of oil reserves.

Western shallow water section

The field was explored in 1958–63. The first offshore platform was installed by 1976. Production in this section started in 1982. It consisted of 4 steel jackets for drilling of 10 wells. As per 1980 data, the platform produced 320 tonnes of oil per day.

As of 1995, Gunashli was producing  of oil. Because of steadily falling rate of production (9%), SOCAR hired Kvaerner to provide project management to rehabilitate Gunashli. In March 2008, a high-flow-rate well No. 244 was put into operation through the platform No. 13. The well was drilled by SOCAR subsidiary Azeri Drilling Company Ltd. The well No. 247 was drilled by Bayil Limani Offshore Exploration Drilling Unit through platform No. 14. It produces 100 tonnes per day.

Eastern deep water section
The deep water section of Gunashli (also called DWG) field has been included for development within the ACG project's Phase III. First oil from DWG was produced on 20 April 2008 from one of 10 pre-drilled wells. ACG's DWG complex is located in the eastern side of the Gunashli field and includes two bridge-linked platforms:
a 48-slot drilling, utilities and quarters (DUQ) platform
a process, gas compression, water injection and utilities (PCWU) platform
Oil produced at DWG is transported through a  oil pipeline tie-ins and single  gas pipeline tie-in into pre-installed pipeline junctions from Azeri field leading to Sangachal Terminal. The DWG has 9 operating wells.

1986 fire

In Soviet times, on 12 July 1986 a fire broke out on an exploration platform in the Gunashli oilfield. Three oil workers and two rescuers died. While the incident was blamed on an engineer, widespread rumors claimed that faulty and outdated equipment caused the fire. After this incident, a minor protest against government neglect took place in front of the Government House. Protestors were arrested and described as hooligans by the Soviet press.

2015 fire

On 4 December 2015, a deadly fire broke out in the northern part of platform No. 10 at the western section of the oilfield. The fire started, according to SOCAR, when a high-pressure underwater gas pipeline was damaged in a heavy storm. As a result of the fire, the platform, which had been in service since 1984, partially collapsed.

At the time of the accident, 63 workers were on the platform. According to the Ministry of Emergency Situations of Azerbaijan, seven workers are confirmed to have been killed, 23 are missing, 33 were rescued; and nine were hospitalized.

See also

References

External links
Image showing Chirag within ACG fields

BP oil and gas fields
Caspian Sea
Oil fields of Azerbaijan